Edmund Heath (September 13, 1813 – January 21, 1883) was a Quebec lumber merchant and political figure. He was a Conservative member of the 1st Canadian Parliament representing Pontiac.

He was born in Bristol, England in 1813. He settled in Clarendon township in Lower Canada, where he entered the timber trade. Heath helped found the Bytown and Prescott Railway in 1853. In 1855, he was appointed Crown lands agent at Fort-Coulonge. He also served as major in the Pontiac county militia. He was elected to the 6th Parliament of the Province of Canada representing Pontiac in 1857; he was defeated in the election of 1861. In 1867, he was elected to the House of Commons.

He died at Clarendon in 1883.

References
 
 

1813 births
1883 deaths
English emigrants to pre-Confederation Quebec
Members of the Legislative Assembly of the Province of Canada from Canada East
Conservative Party of Canada (1867–1942) MPs
Members of the House of Commons of Canada from Quebec
Immigrants to Lower Canada
Anglophone Quebec people